"+1" is a single by French DJ and record producer Martin Solveig featuring British songstress Sam White (vocals). The track was released in France as a digital download on 6 July 2015. It was written by Solveig, Samantha Urbani and C. Low. "+1" peaked at number 31 on the French Singles Chart, and also charted in Belgium and the Netherlands.

The song was given an official UK release on 4 December 2015, hoping to emulate the success of previous single "Intoxicated".

Music video
A music video to accompany the release of "+1" was first released onto YouTube on 8 June 2015 at a total length of three minutes and thirteen seconds.

Track listing

Charts

Weekly charts

Year-end charts

Certifications

Release history

References

2015 singles
2015 songs
Martin Solveig songs
Songs written by Martin Solveig
Spinnin' Records singles
Songs written by Cass Lowe